Parliamentary elections were held in the Free City of Danzig on 28 May 1933. The Nazi Party emerged as the largest party, receiving 50% of the vote and winning 38 of the 72 seats in the Volkstag, the first time any party had won a majority of seats in the legislature. Voter turnout was 92%.

The elections were held under violent circumstances, with the Nazis attacking the electoral events of the opposition. The campaign was heavily influenced by the Great Depression as well as the Nazi seizure of power in Germany. After the victory, the Nazis enacted dictatorial measures that violated the constitution. The next election would be held under mass repression and fraud, making the 1933 election the last with a free choice.

Results

References

Elections in the Free City of Danzig
Danzig